Henry W. Timmer (June 18, 1873 – December 8, 1963) was an American farmer, businessman, and politician.

Born in Gibbsville, Sheboygan County, Wisconsin, Timmer went to Sheboygan Business School. He was a farmer, bank clerk, hardware dealer, and tinsmith. He owned a hardware store in Waldo, Wisconsin. He served as Sheboygan County clerk and on the Sheboygan County Board of Supervisors. Timmer also served as town clerk, town, treasurer, and chairman of the town board. Timmer was the postmaster for Waldo, Wisconsin and was a Republican. He was a member of the Sheboygan County Normal School Board and clerk of the local Selective System Board. From 1945 to 1955, Timmer served in the Wisconsin State Assembly. Timmer died at a hospital in Plymouth, Wisconsin.

Notes

1873 births
1963 deaths
People from Lima, Sheboygan County, Wisconsin
Businesspeople from Wisconsin
Farmers from Wisconsin
County clerks in Wisconsin
County supervisors in Wisconsin
Mayors of places in Wisconsin
School board members in Wisconsin
Republican Party members of the Wisconsin State Assembly
Wisconsin postmasters
People from Waldo, Wisconsin